K class or Class K may refer to:

Locomotives
 LB&SCR K class (1913), England
 SECR K and SR K1 classes (1914), England
 NZR K class (1877), New Zealand
 NZR K class (1932), New Zealand
 Tasmanian Government Railways K class, Tasmania
 Victorian Railways K class, Australia
 WAGR K class, steam, Western Australia
 WAGR K class (diesel), Western Australia

Ships
 K-class destroyer, British warships of World War II
 German K class cruiser, German warships of World War II
 K-class sloop, Dutch warships
 K-class submarine (disambiguation), several classes of warships
 British Columbia K-class ferry, Canadian ships
 Sydney K-class ferry, Sydney Harbour ferries
 K-class torpedo boat, Dutch warships

Other uses
 K-class blimp, blimps built for the US Navy 
 Class K, a classification for stars
 Energy class, an earthquake magnitude scale